Rev. William Washington Browne (October 20, 1849 – December 21, 1897) was American Union Army soldier, and the founder of the Grand Fountain of the United Order of True Reformers. Browne was also a former slave, minister, and a teacher.

Early life
Ben Browne was born on October 20, 1849 into slavery on a Georgia plantation in Habersham County, owned by Benjamin Pryor. His parents were Joseph Browne and Mariah Browne, both of whom were enslaved. He was sold to a horse trader around age eight and after this sale Browne changed his name to William Washington. Browne escaped his owners during the Civil War and joined the Union army, where he remained until he was discharged from service in 1862. After discharge Browne attended school in Wisconsin and began a teaching position in the South. He met and married Mary A. Graham.

He was an outspoken proponent of the temperance movement and  against the Ku Klux Klan. Brown initially sought to join the Independent Order of Good Templars, but was denied membership because the society was traditionally white. The society did offer Browne the option of opening a sponsored charter named the Grand United Order of True Reformers, which he accepted.

Grand Fountain of the United Order of True Reformers 

The Grand United Order of True Reformers started as an American American temperance organization. In  Browne was invited to spearhead a new branch of the movement in Richmond, Virginia under his leadership, named the Grand Fountain of the United Order of True Reformers. When interest in the organization began to decrease Browne began shifting the organization from a temperance society to an insurance organization, a movement that required Browne to move to Richmond in 1880. Over time the organization grew in size to where it managed a bank, ran a newspaper entitled the Reformer, owned several properties, and at one point in time was the largest black fraternal society and black-owned business in the United States.

During Browne's life the organization enjoyed success, however it suffered crippling setbacks in 1910 due to employee embezzlement and businesses defaulting on large unsecured loans, causing its collapse.

Death and burial
Browne died in Washington, D.C. on December 21, 1897 due to a cancer that spread from his arm. His funeral was large and featured many from Richmond’s black community. He was buried at Union Sycamore Cemetery in Barton Heights, but was disinterred under the instructions of the widow and reinterred on Saturday, May 4, 1918 in Woodland Cemetery in Henrico County, Virginia.

See also
 True Reformer Building

References

Further reading

External links

 Celebrating Black History Month, Part II: Reconstruction at the National Endowment for the Humanities
 Grand Fountain of the United Order of True Reformers at Encyclopedia Virginia
 William Washington Browne at Findagrave

1849 births
1897 deaths
19th-century American slaves
People from Habersham County, Georgia
Union Army soldiers